Književni jug ("Literary south" in Serbo-Croatian) was a literary magazine published in 1918 and 1919 in Zagreb. In the spirit of idea of integral Yugoslavism involved authors sought to prepare the ground for future Yugoslav literature. From January to July 1918, its editors were Ivo Andrić, Niko Bartulović, Vladimir Ćorović and Branko Mašić. It was one of the most influential pro-Yugoslav journals in that time. Journal published Serbo-Croatian works in both Serbian Cyrillic alphabet and Gaj's Latin alphabet, as well as untranslated works Slovene. In July 1918, Anton Novačan and Miloš Crnjanski joined journal, while Ćorović left it. Prominent authors whose works are published in Književni jug include Tin Ujević, Miroslav Krleža, Antun Barac, Vladimir Nazor, Isidora Sekulić, Sima Pandurović, Aleksa Šantić, Borivoje Jevtić, Ivo Vojnović, Dragutin Domjanić, Dinko Šimunović, Gustav Krklec, Ivan Cankar, Fran Albreht, and Ksaver Meško.

References

1918 establishments in Croatia
Defunct literary magazines published in Europe
Defunct magazines published in Croatia
Croatian-language magazines
Magazines established in 1918
Magazines disestablished in 1919
Mass media in Zagreb
Serbian-language magazines
Slovene-language magazines
Magazines published in Yugoslavia